The Choro Q video games are a series of video games based on Takara's Choro Q toy cars (also known as Penny Racers in English-speaking markets). The games have been localised for Western release under many different names, including Gadget Racers, Penny Racers and Road Trip.

Most of these games were developed by external companies, although they are usually credited to Takara since the developers' name rarely appears outside of the ending credits. Some of these developers include Tamsoft (Choro Q, Choro Q 2 and Choro Q 3), Barnhouse Effect (Shin Combat Choro Q, Choro Q HG and Choro Q HG 4), E-game (Choro Q Wonderful!, Choro Q HG 2 and Choro Q HG 3), Electronics Application (aka Eleca) (Choro Q Advance, Choro Q Advance 2, Choro Q: Hyper Customable GB and Perfect Choro Q). Most are auto racing games with extensive opportunities for customization, often including role-playing video game-style elements such as towns and side-quests.

Overseas releases
Only three games in the series were released outside Japan prior to 2001 (including the 1984 MSX game by Taito, which is unrelated to the later Choro Q titles) - Choro Q for the PlayStation (released in Europe only as Penny Racers) and Choro Q 64 for the Nintendo 64 (released in North America and Europe as Penny Racers). However, since 2001 many of the titles have been released in the US and PAL regions as budget titles, by publishers including Conspiracy Entertainment, Midas Interactive Entertainment and Play It!.

Series history

References

External links 
 Barnhouse Effect
 E-Game
 Takara Games
 Choro Q  Playstation 2 game.

1984 video games
Takara video games
Video game franchises
Video games based on Takara Tomy toys
Video games developed in Japan
Lists of video games by franchise